USS Williams has been the name of more than one United States Navy ship, and may refer to:

 , a patrol vessel in commission from March to December 1918
 , a  cancelled in 1944

See also
 
 

United States Navy ship names